

Belgium
Belgian Congo – Auguste Tilkens, Governor-General of the Belgian Congo (1927–1934)

France
 French Somaliland – Pierre Aimable Chapon-Baissac, Governor of French Somaliland (1924–1932)
 Guinea –
 Jean Louis Georges Poiret, Lieutenant-Governor of Guinea (1928–1929)
 Louis François Antonin, acting Lieutenant-Governor of Guinea (1929–1931)

Japan
 Karafuto –
Kōji Kita, Governor-General of Karafuto (27 July 1927 – 9 July 1929)
Shinobu Agata, Governor-General of Karafuto (9 July 1929 – 17 December 1931)
 Korea –
Yamanashi Hanzō, Governor-General of Korea (1927–1929)
Saitō Makoto, Governor-General of Korea (1929–1931)
 Taiwan –
Takeji Kawamura, Governor-General of Taiwan (16 June 1928 – July 1929)
Ishizuka Eizō, Governor-General of Taiwan (30 July 1929 – January 1931)

Portugal
 Angola –
 António Damas Mora, High Commissioner of Angola (1928–1929)
 Filomeno da Câmara Melo Cabral, High Commissioner of Angola (1929–1930)

United Kingdom
 Malta Colony – John Philip Du Cane, Governor of Malta (1927–1931)
 Northern Rhodesia – Sir James Crawford Maxwell, Governor of Northern Rhodesia (1927–1932)

Notes

Colonial governors
Colonial governors
1929